V455 Andromedae (often abbreviated to V455 And) is a dwarf nova in the constellation Andromeda. It has a typical apparent visual magnitude of 16.5, but reached a magnitude of 8.5 during the only observed outburst.

System
When it was discovered in 2003, during the quiescent phase, V455 Andromedae was classified as a cataclysmic variable, since its spectrum is similar to U Geminorum. V455 Andromedae is therefore a binary star where the primary is a white dwarf that is accreting matter from the secondary donor star. The rotation period of the white dwarf, slightly less than 68 seconds, is shorter than the orbital period so the white dwarf must possess a magnetic field channelling the material from the accretion disk to the poles of the white dwarf.  This qualifies V455 Andromedae as a cataclysmic variable of the intermediate polar type. The spin period is expected to become shorter with time, but to date only upper limits on its decreasing trend has been determined.

The mass of the donor star is only .  This low mass makes V455 Andromedae similar to WZ Sagittae dwarf novae, which are expected to have a long period between outbursts.

Variability
Eclipses in the light curve of V455 Andromedae revealed the binary nature of this star and its orbital period.  Only one outburst event has been observed so far: V455 Andromedae brightened by 8 magnitudes during 2007.  Such a large increase in brightness implies that this was a superoutburst, and V455 Andromedae is therefore a dwarf nova of the SU Ursae Majoris type. Superhumps were observed during the outburst.

Superhumps have also been reported during quiescence, known as permanent superhumps.  An  positive superhump was observed in 2000 - 2003, while  negative superhumps were seen in 2013 and 2014.  This is the first time negative superhumps have been detected in WZ sagittae dwarf novae during quiescence.

V455 Andromedae shows spectroscopic variations in its line profiles with a period of 3.5 hours.  This is taken to be the precession period of a warped accretion disk, possibly retrograde precession.

The white dwarf primary pulsates radially with periods of about five or six minutes. These are considered to be incoherent, or possibly to consist of too many different periods to be analysed.

The brightness of V455 And has been gradually fading since 2008, mainly due to the gradual cooling of the white dwarf and the hot spot on the accretion disk and/or lower
mass transfer, until an equilibrium level has been reached.

References

Andromeda (constellation)
Andromedae, V455
Dwarf novae
J23340144+3921408